Vissers is a Dutch occupational surname, meaning "fisherman's". Notable people with the surname include:

Edward Vissers (1912–1994), Belgian racing cyclist
Job Vissers (born 1984), Dutch racing cyclist
Joseph Vissers (1928–2006), Belgian lightweight boxer
Linda Vissers (born 1961), Belgian Flemish politician
Margreet Vissers, New Zealand biochemistry academic
Melvin Vissers (born 1996), Dutch football midfielder
Wesley Vissers (born 1993), Dutch bodybuilder

See also
Visser

References

Dutch-language surnames
Occupational surnames